Williamsing Nalisa (born 18 November 1999) is a Vanuatuan cricketer. In April 2018, he was named in Vanuatu's squad for the 2018 ICC World Cricket League Division Four tournament in Malaysia. He played in Vanuatu's opening match of the tournament, against Jersey.

In August 2018, he was named in Vanuatu's squad for Group A of the 2018–19 ICC World Twenty20 East Asia-Pacific Qualifier tournament. In March 2019, he was named in the Vanuatuan squad for the Regional Finals of the 2018–19 ICC World Twenty20 East Asia-Pacific Qualifier tournament. He made his Twenty20 International (T20I) debut for Vanuatu against Papua New Guinea on 22 March 2019.

In June 2019, he was selected to represent the Vanuatu cricket team in the men's tournament at the 2019 Pacific Games. In September 2019, he was named in Vanuatu's squad for the 2019 Malaysia Cricket World Cup Challenge League A tournament. He made his List A debut for Vanuatu, against Canada, in the Cricket World Cup Challenge League A tournament on 17 September 2019.

References

External links
 

1999 births
Living people
Vanuatuan cricketers
Vanuatu Twenty20 International cricketers
Place of birth missing (living people)